Charles Okonkwo  is a former Nigerian international football player.

Career
During his playing career he played for Enugu Rangers in the Nigerian Premier League.

International career
He also participated in Nigeria's qualification attempt for the 1990 FIFA World Cup.

References

1965 births
Living people
Nigerian footballers
Nigeria international footballers
Nigerian expatriate footballers
Rangers International F.C. players
AC Omonia players
Cypriot First Division players
Expatriate footballers in Cyprus
Footballers from Enugu State
Footballers from Enugu
Association footballers not categorized by position